Rainbow Valley is the second studio album by Australian singer Matt Corby. It was released on 2 November 2018 through Universal Music Australia.

At the ARIA Music Awards of 2019, the album was nominated for three awards; Best Male Artist, Best Soul/R&B Release while Dann Hume won Producer of the Year for this release.

At the J Awards of 2019, the album won Australian Album of the Year.

Background 
Corby spent time travelling and experimenting with a friend Alex Henriksson, with the ideas they created becoming the basis for Rainbow Valley.

Following the August 2018 release of "No Ordinary Life", Corby released the single "All Fired Up" and announced the release of Rainbow Valley. "All That I See" was released as the album's third single in October 2018.

Corby plays all instruments and sings all vocals on the record.

Track listing

Personnel
Credits adapted from the album's liner notes and AllMusic.com.

 Matt Corby – composer, drums, keyboards, piano, primary artist, strings, synthesizer, vocals, backing vocals
 Dann Hume – composer, mixing, producer, recording
 Matthew Neighbour – engineer, co-producer, recording
 Andrei Eremin – mastering

Charts

Year-end charts

References

2018 albums
Matt Corby albums
Albums produced by Matt Corby
Universal Music Australia albums